Guo Xiaochuan (1919-1976), original name Guo Enda, was a Chinese poet. He joined the Eighth Route Army in 1937, and began to write free-verse poems during the second Sino-Japanese War. After 1949, he worked for the Publicity Department of the Communist Party of China.

Guo's best known poems includes One and Eight (on which Zhang Junzhao's film of the same name is based), Tree Songs on Forested Areas, Forest of Sugar Cane -- Gree Gauze Curtain and Gazing at the Starring Sky. Along with He Jingzhi, he is considered as one of the major practitioners of "political lyric poetry" style. However, Guo's poems care more about individual perception, and some of his works were strictly criticized in China in the late 1950s.

References

People's Republic of China poets
People from Chengde
Accidental deaths in the People's Republic of China
1919 births
1976 deaths
Northeastern University (China) alumni
20th-century poets
Poets from Hebei
Victims of the Cultural Revolution